Mohammed Al-Shahrani may refer to:

 Mohammed Al-Shahrani (footballer, born 1982), Saudi footballer
 Mohammed Al-Shahrani (footballer, born 1996), Saudi footballer